Itex may refer to:
IT Examiner, an Indian I.T. web site
Itex, a fictitious firm in Maximum Ride: Saving the World and Other Extreme Sports
 iTeX, a fictitious XML-based successor to TeX announced by Donald Knuth at the TUG 2010 Conference

See also
iText, a free online Mozilla Public License open source library
International Tundra Experiment (ITEX)